Three Wishes is the seventh studio album by American R&B singer Miki Howard. It was released by Peak Records on March 27, 2001. The album features production by Barry Eastmond, LeMel Humes, and  Family Matters actor Darius McCrary, who also sings background vocals on the track "Meant to Be." Executive producers on Three Wishes include Russ Freeman of jazz band The Rippingtons and Andi Howard. The album peaked at number 60 on the US Top R&B/Hip-Hop Albums chart but failed to chart on the US Billboard 200. It was nominated in the Best Traditional R&B Vocal Album category at the 2002 Grammy Awards.

Critical reception

AllMusic editor Alex Henderson called the album a "pleasant, if unremarkable, CD." He found that "instead of trying to make herself relevant to the hip-hop-minded R&B scene of the early '00s, Howard sticks to her guns and emphasizes adult-oriented quiet storm music [...] Three Wishes won't go down in history as one of Howard's more essential releases, although her hardcore fans will probably want to hear it anyway."

Track listing

Charts

References

2001 albums
Miki Howard albums
Peak Records albums